Anne Dormer (née Cotterell) (c. 1648–1695), was an English letter writer. She was the spouse of Robert Dormer (1628?–1689) of Rousham in Oxfordshire. Her correspondence with her sister Elizabeth has been used in several recent histories on the domestic concerns of seventeenth century women and their legal and romantic relationships with men (part of the study of women's history).

Anne was the daughter of Sir Charles Cotterell and sister of Elizabeth (or Katherine) who married Sir William Trumbull (who went on diplomatic missions to Paris and Constantinople, and was later Secretary of State). Anne married Robert Dormer of Rousham in Oxfordshire. James Dormer (1679–1741) was their son.

Notes

References

1695 deaths
Year of birth unknown
Anne